The 1977–78 Liga Dalet season saw 102 clubs competing in 8 regional divisions for promotion to Liga Gimel.

Bnei Tarshiha, Hapoel Bu'eine, Hapoel Kafr Manda, Hapoel Muawiya, Hapoel Pardesiya, Hapoel Amishav, Beitar Yavne and Hapoel Bnei Shimon won their regional divisions and promoted to Liga Gimel.

Over the summer, 14 further clubs were promoted to Liga Gimel due to vacancies created in the upper leagues.

Galilee Division

Bay Division

Maccabi Majd al-Krum had 4 points deducted.
Beitar Kafr Kanna had 2 points deducted.

Haifa Division

Hapoel Bir al-Maksur and Hapoel Bnei Hujeirat had 2 points deducted.

Samaria Division

Haposl Sha'ul Afula had 2 points deducted.

Sharon Division

Haposl Caesarea had 2 points deducted.

Dan Division

Central Division

Maccabi Tahanat Rakevet Lod and Maccabi Sde Uziyah had 2 points deducted.
Hapoel Antonio Jaffa had 4 points deducted.

South Division

References
Memo no. 188 IFA 

Liga Gimel seasons
6